Eslamabad-e Makdin (also Romanized as Eslāmābād-e Makdīn) is a village in Pishkuh-e Mugui Rural District, in the Central District of Fereydunshahr County, Isfahan Province, Iran. At the 2006 census, its population was 126, in 23 families.

References 

Populated places in Fereydunshahr County